The legislature of the U.S. state of Colorado has convened many times since statehood became effective on August 1, 1876.

Legislatures

Legislative Assembly of the Territory of Colorado
The Legislative Assembly of the Territory of Colorado did not number its legislatures; rather, it numbered its sessions, which occurred occasionally from 1861 to 1876.

1865 State Legislature
For a brief time in 1865, Colorado had an approved state constitution, and selected a legislature and other elected officials. The legislature briefly convened, believing that their statehood had been approved. However, Andrew Johnson vetoed the corresponding enabling act, and the body that met as the state legislature was disbanded. This legislature met from December 12 through December 19, 1865.

General Assembly of the State of Colorado

The state legislature has met in Denver, Colorado since its founding.

See also
 Legislative staff in Colorado
 List of governors of Colorado
 History of Colorado

References

Further reading

External links
 Colorado General Assembly. Bills, Resolutions, & Memorials, 2016–present
 Colorado General Assembly. Legislative sessions, 1997-2015
 Colorado General Assembly. Colorado Legislators Past and Present
 Colorado State Archives. Legislative Records
 
 

Legislature
 
Colorado
Legislatures
colorado